The 2018 Russian Grand Prix (officially the Formula 1 2018 VTB Russian Grand Prix) was a Formula One motor race held on 30 September 2018 at the Sochi Autodrom in Sochi, Russia. The race was the 16th round of the 2018 Formula One World Championship and marked the 7th running of the Russian Grand Prix and the 5th time the race had been held in Sochi.

Mercedes driver Lewis Hamilton entered the round with a 40-point lead over Sebastian Vettel in the Drivers' Championship. In the World Constructors' Championship, Mercedes led Ferrari by 37 points.

The race was one of controversy, as Mercedes enacted team orders to swap their two drivers, handing Lewis Hamilton the win and Valtteri Bottas would move to 2nd place for the race finish.

The race result sparked discussion regarding the future of team orders in the sport, and some even going as to call for an outright ban on the practice.

Report

Background
The race was moved from its April date to September to fill the vacancy of the Malaysian Grand Prix, which was discontinued at the end of the 2017 season.

During the weekend, the first DRS zone was extended by 100 meters so that the beginning of the DRS zone started 95 meters before turn 1.

Practice
Artem Markelov replaced Carlos Sainz Jr. at Renault during the first practice session.

Race
At the start, Sebastian Vettel got a better start than Lewis Hamilton, but there was no room to overtake heading into turn one. On lap 4, both Scuderia Toro Rosso drivers Pierre Gasly and Brendon Hartley suffered brake failures which forced both to retire; they were the only retirements of the race.

Later on lap 14, Hamilton made his one and only pitstop of the race, putting him behind Vettel. Two laps later, Hamilton made a move on Sebastian Vettel at turn 3 and passed him into fourth place into turn 4.

The most notable moment of the race came on lap 26, when Mercedes asked Valtteri Bottas to let Lewis Hamilton through into second at turn 13, gifting the Briton the race win. Max Verstappen, who led the race since lap 19, came in for his pitstop on lap 42.

Hamilton won the race for the third time in his career, with Valtteri Bottas second and Sebastian Vettel completing the podium in third place. As a consequence, Hamilton extended his lead over Vettel in the championship to 50 points.

Classification

Qualifying

Notes
  – Max Verstappen received a 43-place grid penalty: 35 places for exceeding his quota of power unit elements, 5 places for an unscheduled gearbox change and 3 places for a yellow flag infringement in qualifying.
  – Daniel Ricciardo received a 40-place grid penalty: 35 places for exceeding his quota of power unit elements and 5 places for an unscheduled gearbox change.
  – Pierre Gasly received a 35-place grid penalty for exceeding his quota of power unit elements.
  – Brendon Hartley received a 40-place grid penalty for exceeding his quota of power unit elements.
  – Fernando Alonso received a 30-place grid penalty for exceeding his quota of power unit elements.
  – Stoffel Vandoorne received a 5-place grid penalty for an unscheduled gearbox change.

Despite receiving no penalties, both of the Renault drivers elected not to run any laps on Q2 due to them automatically receiving places 11 and 12. They were then able to start the race on fresh tyres of their choice.

Race

Championship standings after the race 

Drivers' Championship standings

Constructors' Championship standings

 Note: Only the top five positions are included for both sets of standings.
 Bold text and an asterisk indicates competitors who still had a theoretical chance of becoming World Champion.

See also 
 2018 Sochi Formula 2 round
 2018 Sochi GP3 Series round

References

Russia
Grand Prix
Russian Grand Prix
Russian Grand Prix